Ivor Weitzer (born 24 May 1988) is a Croatian football player who plays for Opatija in the Croatian Second Football League.

Career
Born in Rijeka, in his first professional season he had one appearance with Rijeka during the 2006–07 Prva HNL. Since then, he played for Orijent, Pomorac, Široki Brijeg and Istra 1961. He was the top scorer of Pomorac in the 2011–12 Druga HNL. In 2012, he moved back to Rijeka, where he spent one season.

Career statistics

References

External links
 

1988 births
Living people
Footballers from Rijeka
Association football midfielders
Croatian footballers
Croatia youth international footballers
HNK Rijeka players
HNK Orijent players
NK Pomorac 1921 players
NK Široki Brijeg players
NK Istra 1961 players
Malavan players
NK Zadar players
Pécsi MFC players
NK Lučko players
Panelefsiniakos F.C. players
KF Vllaznia Shkodër players
Buxoro FK players
FK Sloboda Tuzla players
Al-Arabi SC (UAE) players
NK Opatija players
Erbil SC players
Croatian Football League players
Second Football League (Croatia) players
First Football League (Croatia) players
Premier League of Bosnia and Herzegovina players
Persian Gulf Pro League players
Nemzeti Bajnokság I players
Football League (Greece) players
Kategoria e Parë players
Uzbekistan Super League players
UAE First Division League players
Croatian expatriate footballers
Expatriate footballers in Bosnia and Herzegovina
Expatriate footballers in Iran
Expatriate footballers in Hungary
Expatriate footballers in Greece
Expatriate footballers in Albania
Expatriate footballers in Uzbekistan
Expatriate footballers in the United Arab Emirates
Expatriate footballers in Iraq
Croatian expatriate sportspeople in Bosnia and Herzegovina
Croatian expatriate sportspeople in Iran
Croatian expatriate sportspeople in Hungary
Croatian expatriate sportspeople in Greece
Croatian expatriate sportspeople in Albania
Croatian expatriate sportspeople in the United Arab Emirates
Croatian expatriate sportspeople in Iraq